Memphis University School (MUS) is a college-preparatory, independent, day school for boys, grades 7–12, located in Memphis, Tennessee.

History

The Original Campus (1893–1936)

Edwin Sidney Werts and James White Sheffey Rhea founded MUS as a college-preparatory school for boys in the fall of 1893. Their purpose was threefold: to prepare boys for competitive colleges, to provide them with a liberal arts education, and to help them develop into cultured Christian gentlemen. Patterned largely after Werts's alma mater, the University of Virginia, MUS embraced high academic standards, strong moral development, and an emphasis on athletics.  The school adopted red and blue as its official colors to represent the academics standards of two universities, Harvard and Yale. In a short time, the school's reputation was so sound that many of America's leading colleges began to exempt MUS students from entrance examinations or allowed them to take the exams at MUS. After a disappointing initial enrollment, MUS prospered. Within three years, it outgrew its temporary quarters in the old Bethel Building in Downtown Memphis and occupied the Clara Conway Institute at 297 Poplar Avenue. Shortly after the move, the proprietors built their own building on a small campus near the corner of Madison and Manassas. There the school remained until 1936, when economic factors forced its closure.

The Current Campus (1955–Present)

The economic boom of the 1950s revitalized MUS, and classes began again in 1955 under the leadership of Col. Ross M. Lynn and a dedicated Board of Trustees chaired by Alexander Wellford. The School relocated to its  current 94-acre (380,000 m2) campus at 6191 Park Avenue in East Memphis. By 1958, it graduated its first seniors. Like the first MUS, the new one emphasized academic excellence, high moral standards, strong athletic development, and gentlemanly conduct. Its student-enforced honor system became the moral heart of the school. During the 1960s, the new MUS grew to maturity. Seniors acquired off-campus lunch privileges; Hutchison School moved in next door; the Hyde Chapel was built; and sophisticated language labs were added. Leigh MacQueen became academic dean, Bill Hatchett guided annual student tours to Europe, and MUS worked at living up to its namesake. Clubs and other extracurricular activities proliferated as students increasingly helped run the school.

In the 1970s, the school added the Hull Lower School, the Hyde Library, the Fisher Fine Arts Wing, and the McCaughan Science building, fulfilling the school's basic physical plant needs. Ellis Haguewood began his irreverent and hilarious school day picture day (SDPD) talks and served a 16-year stint as yearbook adviser. The school's academics became stronger in a climate of increased diversity. Both faculty and curriculum grew much stronger through the 1970s and the 1980s, and enrollment reached nearly 600 students.

In 1990, the school constructed the Sue H. Hyde Sports and Physical Education Center, symbolizing that it had become as much an athletic as an academic powerhouse. Thorn retired in 1992, and William Campbell succeeded Thorn as headmaster for three years. In 1995 the Board of Trustees selected Upper School principal Ellis Haguewood to lead the school.

Under the leadership of Headmaster Haguewood and Chairman of the Board Ben Adams (1996-2004), MUS implemented a long-term strategic plan. This included a master plan for expanding and updating the physical plant and a massive capital campaign (more than $21 million total) to fund improvements. The Crump Firm's master plan included a new tennis center with a clubhouse, renovation and expansion of the Hull Lower School, erecting a commodious new Campus Center, and razing and replacing the Upper School and the Clack Dining Hall. Construction, including the new Dunavant Upper School, was completed by January 2003. Alumnus Trow Gillespie, who had spearheaded the fundraising, replaced Ben Adams in 2004 as chairman of the Board of Trustees. Bob Loeb became chairman in 2008, followed by Sam Graham in 2013, and Jim Burnett in 2020. 

Ellis Haguewood retired in June 2017 after 48 years at the school, including 22 as headmaster. The Board of Trustees selected Pete Sanders from Greenville, South Carolina, as the new headmaster. In February 2021 the school announced a new strategic plan, Legacy Forward, with six strategic goals guided by 12 implementation champions representing the Board and the school.

Academics
MUS enrolls about 640 students from grades 7-12. The student-faculty ratio is 7 to 1, and average class size is 15 students.

The school’s intensive academic program emphasizes Advanced Placement and Honors Accelerated courses, offering 22 AP courses for college credit. Historically, more than 90 percent of MUS students score a 3 or above on their AP exams. MUS grades are weighted on a 4.0 scale.  Every year a large portion of MUS students are honored by College Board for their performance on standardized tests. MUS claims a 100 percent four-year college acceptance rate.

Faculty

For the 2020-21 school year, the faculty includes 99 teachers, three college counselors, and three guidance counselors. Seventy percent of faculty hold master's degrees or doctorates. Average teaching experience for faculty is 25 years. MUS maintains endowed teaching chairs for its faculty.

Notable alumni
 Richard Halliburton, 1915, Author, adventurer
 Nash Buckingham, 1898, Author
 Allen B. Morgan Jr. '60, Co-founder, CEO, and chairman of Morgan Keegan & Company
 J. R. Hyde III '61, Founder of Autozone
 Frederick W. Smith '62, Founder, CEO of FedEx
 John Fry '62, Founder of Ardent Studios
 Admiral Charles H. Johnston '66, United States Navy
 Michael Beck '67, Actor
 Michael O'Brien '68, photographer
 Chris Bell '69, Musician, member of Big Star
 Andy Hummel '69, Musician, member of Big Star
 Paul Tudor Jones '72, Hedge Fund Manager
 Hampton Sides '80, Author, Ghost Soldiers, Blood and Thunder
 Edward Felsenthal '84, Editor-in-Chief, Time Magazine
John H. Dobbs '85, businessman
 Griff Jenkins '89, radio producer and Fox News television personality
 David O. Sacks '90, Founder and CEO of Web 2.0 company Geni, Inc.; former COO of PayPal; movie producer: ex. Thank You for Smoking
 Tom Hutton '91, Former University of Tennessee and NFL punter
 Siddharth Kara '92, Writer, expert on human trafficking
 Hank Sullivant '01, Musician, frontman for Kuroma, past bassist for The Whigs, touring guitarist for MGMT
 Harry Ford, Actor, star of CBS TV series, Code Black
 Henry Gayden '98, Screenwriter - Known for his writing in Earth to Echo (2014), Shazam! (2019) and There's Someone Inside Your House (2020)

References

Private high schools in Tennessee
Educational institutions established in 1893
Boys' schools in the United States
Preparatory schools in Tennessee
Schools in Memphis, Tennessee
Private middle schools in Tennessee
1893 establishments in Tennessee
[Category:National Lacrosse league]